Columbia City High School is a public high school located in Columbia City, Indiana.

Notable Alumni 

 Jim Banks - U.S. representative for Indiana's 3rd congressional district
 Hannah Schaefer - Christian musician
 Cleon H. Foust - Thirty-second Indiana Attorney General
 Ralph F. Gates - 37th governor of Indiana
 Oral Swigart - American naval officer

See also
 List of high schools in Indiana

References

External links
 Official Website

Public high schools in Indiana
Schools in Whitley County, Indiana
1889 establishments in Indiana